Waco is the fourth studio album by Australian alternative rock band Violent Soho. It was released on I Oh You Records in March 2016. The album came first in the annual Triple J Top 10 albums of the year poll.

At the J Awards of 2016, the album was nominated for Australian Album of the Year.

Title 
According to frontman Luke Boerdam, WACO is like Hungry Ghost’s “older sister: Hungry Ghost dealt with the spiritual skeleton we’ve become from this spoon-fed reality. WACO is more about control and illusion: what the skeleton is being fed”.

Reception 
The album fared well with critics and came first in Triple Js annual album of the year poll. All six of the album's singles placed within Triple J's Hottest 100 with Like Soda reaching 15 in 2015 and How To Taste, No Shade, So Sentimental, Blanket and Viceroy reaching 92, 73, 69, 53 and 14 respectively in 2016 making Violent Soho the number one act of the year with five songs charting.

Track listing

Personnel

Violent Soho
 Luke Boerdam – lead vocals, rhythm guitars
 James Tidswell – lead guitars
 Luke Henery – bass guitar, backing vocals
 Michael Richards – drums, percussion

Charts

Weekly charts

Year-end charts

Certifications

Accolades

|-
|rowspan="5"| 2016 ||rowspan="3"| Waco || ARIA Award for Best Group || 
|-
| Best Independent Release || 
|-
| Best Rock Album || 
|-
| "Like Soda" || Best Video || 
|-
| The Waco Tour || Best Australian Live Act || 
|-

References 

2016 albums
Violent Soho albums
SideOneDummy Records albums